Panwali Dwar is a mountain of the Kumaun Himalayas located in the Bageshwar district of Uttarakhand, India. It is 55th highest located entirely within the Uttarakhand. Nanda Devi, is the highest mountain in this category. It lies on southern wall of Nanda devi sanctuary. Its nearest higher neighbor Maiktoli  lies 8.2 km WSW. It is located 2.6 km SW of Nanda Khat  and 9.2 km NE lies Nanda Devi East .

Climbing history
It was first observed by W. Noyce in 1944 but no attempts were made until 1979 when a Japanese team failed on the first assault. They returned in 1980 and successfully climbed it.
In 1990 A team from Bombay led by Prajapati Bodane also claimed of climbing Panwali Dwar. 
On 22 August 2006. a ten-member Indian team of (Mountaineers Association of Krishnanagar, Nadia, West Bengal) made a successful ascent of Panwali Dwar the team led by Debasis Biswas. Basant Singha Roy, Debasis Biswas, Pasang Sherpa and Pemba Sherpa reached the summit. They had followed the traditional route of the first ascent.

Glaciers and rivers

Dakshini Nanda Devi Glacier lies on the northern side of Panwali Dwar. It drains into Rishi Ganga which later joins Dhauli Ganga at Rini and Dhauli Ganga merge with Alaknanda River at Vishnu Prayag one of the main sources of river Ganga. which later joins Bhagirathi river the other main tributaries of river Ganga at Dev Prayag and became Ganga there after. On the east side lies Pindari Glacier from their emerges Pindari River which also joins Alaknanda river at Karn Prayag and became part of Alaknanda river.

Neighboring peaks
The neighboring peaks of Panwali Dwar are:
 Nanda Devi: 
 Trisul: 
 Devistan I: 
 Devtoli: 
 Tharkot: 
 Nanda Kot: 
 Nanda Khat: 
 Changuch:

References

Mountains of Uttarakhand
Six-thousanders of the Himalayas
Geography of Chamoli district